Hamilton Disston Elementary School is a historic K-8 school located in the Tacony neighborhood of Philadelphia, Pennsylvania. It is part of the School District of Philadelphia. The building was designed by Irwin T. Catharine and built in 1923–1924. It is a three-story, nine-bay, brick building on a raised basement in the Colonial Revival style. It features a central projecting entrance pavilion, stone arched surrounds, and stone cornice and brick parapet. The school is named after Hamilton Disston.

The building was added to the National Register of Historic Places in 1988.

References

External links

School buildings on the National Register of Historic Places in Philadelphia
Colonial Revival architecture in Pennsylvania
School buildings completed in 1924
Northeast Philadelphia
Public K–8 schools in Philadelphia
School District of Philadelphia
1924 establishments in Pennsylvania